James A. Garfield National Historic Site is a United States National Historic Site located in Mentor, Ohio. The site preserves the Lawnfield estate and surrounding property of James Abram Garfield, the 20th president of the United States, and includes the first presidential library established in the United States.

History
James A. Garfield acquired the home in 1876 to accommodate his large family. During the 1880 presidential election, Garfield conducted what became the first successful front porch campaign from the home, which became known as "Lawnfield" by the reporters covering his campaign. That same year, Garfield had 11 rooms added to the building to accommodate his large family. Garfield was shot four months into his term and died on September 19, 1881. Four years after his assassination, his widow Lucretia Garfield and her family added the Memorial Library wing, setting the precedent for presidential libraries.

Garfield purchased the Mentor residence for several reasons. Until this time, he had been a resident of Hiram and represented the 19th Ohio congressional district.  The Democratic Ohio Legislature had redistricted and removed the Republican Party counties of Ashtabula, Lake, Geauga, and Trumbull from the district, leaving only the Democratic Party counties of Ashland, Stark and Wayne.

Garfield also wanted a place where his sons could learn about farming, as well as a permanent residence where he could spend his summers while Congress was on recess.

Lucretia Garfield lived in the house at least part of every year until her death in 1918.  Her brother, Joseph Rudolph, lived there until he died in 1934.  In 1936, Garfield's children donated the house and its contents to the Western Reserve Historical Society for use as a museum. On December 28, 1980, the United States Congress declared the Garfield home a National Historic Site.

The site was operated by the National Park Service with the Western Reserve Historical Society until January 2008, at which time the WRHS transferred the site's land, buildings and operation to the National Park Service.  the site is managed by Cuyahoga Valley National Park.

Restoration
In the 1990s, a $12.5 million, six-year restoration of the Garfield house took place, with a grand reopening in 1998. The house was redecorated with authentic furniture and household items of 1886–1904 acquired through extensive research by the Denver Service Center of the National Park Service.

The Garfield Historical Site is one of the most accurately restored and highly detailed of the 19th-century U.S. presidential sites. Of its hundreds of examples of antique Victorian furniture, over 80% was owned by the Garfield family themselves in the 1880s. Many others were acquired or recreated by the National Park Service to supplement the collection. Ten wallpapers were also reproduced from photographs, and from samples found under layers of wallpaper applied through the subsequent decades.

Gallery

See also
 List of residences of presidents of the United States
 Presidential memorials in the United States

References

External links

James A. Garfield National Historic Site
Lawnfield: James Garfield’s Mentor Home
"Life Portrait of James Garfield", from C-SPAN's American Presidents: Life Portraits, broadcast from the James A. Garfield National Historic Site, July 26, 1999

Presidential libraries
Mentor, Ohio
Presidential homes in the United States
National Historic Landmarks in Ohio
National Historic Sites in Ohio
Houses on the National Register of Historic Places in Ohio
National Historic Site
Historic house museums in Ohio
National Park Service areas in Ohio
Protected areas established in 1980
Museums in Lake County, Ohio
National Register of Historic Places in Lake County, Ohio
Presidential museums in Ohio
Houses completed in 1876
Houses in Lake County, Ohio